Bahrain participated in the 2010 Summer Youth Olympics in Singapore.

The Bahraini squad consisted of 4 athletes competing in 2 sports: athletics and taekwondo.

Athletics

Boys
Track and Road Events

Taekwondo

References

2010 in Bahraini sport
Nations at the 2010 Summer Youth Olympics
Bahrain at the Youth Olympics